= Kashmir Chamber of Commerce and Industries =

Kashmir Chamber of Commerce & Industry
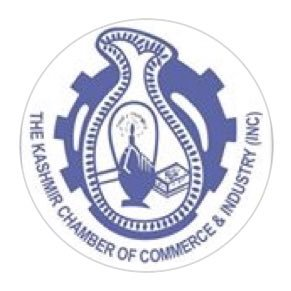
- Abbreviation: KCCI
- Formation: 1934; 92 years ago
- Type: Chamber of commerce
- Headquarters: Kashmir, India
- Region served: Srinagar
- president: Javid Ahmad Bhat alias Tenga
- Website: thekcci.in

Kashmir Chamber Of Commerce and Industries (KCCI) is an Indian chamber of commerce for the Kashmir region that is the apex trade body in the Srinagar area. It was established in 1934 and is headquartered at srinagar Jammu & Kashmir.
